Backdoor.Win32.Seed is the definition of a backdoor Trojan. Its first known detection goes back to February 7th, 2005, according to Securelist (Kaspersky Labs). Meanwhile, there are several variants of this malware, that do not self-replicate (Non-A.I.).

Backdoor.Win32.Seed is spread manually, often under the premise that the .exe file is something beneficial. Distribution channels include IRC, peer-to-peer networks, newsgroup postings and e-mails.

Other aliases 
 RDN/Generic BackDoor  (McAfee)
 Backdoor.Seed  (VBA32)
 Bck/Small.EO  (Panda Labs)

External links 
 Analysis of a file at VirusTotal
 Analysis of a file at Threat Expert

References 

2005 in computing
Windows trojans